Aleksandar Mitrović is a Serbian professional footballer who has represented the Serbia national football team as a forward since his debut on 7 June 2013 in a 2014 FIFA World Cup qualification match against Belgium. On 6 September 2013, he scored his first international goal in a 2014 FIFA World Cup qualification match against Croatia, in what was his third international appearance. Since then, he has become Serbia's all-time record goalscorer with 52 goals in 79 matches.

With six goals in UEFA Group D, Mitrović led Serbia's successful campaign to qualify for the 2018 FIFA World Cup. On 9 June 2018, he scored his first international hat-trick in a friendly against Bolivia. Later that month, he scored the opening goal in a 2018 FIFA World Cup group stage match against Switzerland, which ultimately ended in a 2–1 loss; Serbia were eliminated in the group stage. With six goals, he finished as the top scorer of the inaugural 2018–19 UEFA Nations League, in which Serbia were promoted to League B. In UEFA Euro 2020 qualifying Group B, Mitrović scored 10 goals, second in the group behind only Cristiano Ronaldo, who scored 11. Serbia finished third in the group, but advanced to the play-offs through the UEFA Nations League. They were eliminated by Scotland via penalty shootout after Mitrović failed to convert his penalty. By scoring his 39th goal in a 2022 FIFA World Cup qualifier against Portugal on 27 March 2021, Mitrović surpassed the all-time record for most goals scored for Serbia and its precursor Yugoslavia that had previously been held by Stjepan Bobek. On 14 November 2021, he scored the deciding, last-minute goal in a 2–1 away win over Portugal that resulted in Serbia qualifying directly for the 2022 FIFA World Cup. In the 2022–23 UEFA Nations League, he scored a total of six goals, including a hat-trick against Sweden on 24 September 2022. Three days later, he scored his 50th international goal in a 2–0 away win over Norway that resulted in Serbia being promoted to League A for the first time. He scored two goals at the 2022 FIFA World Cup.

In total, Mitrović has scored 15 goals in FIFA World Cup qualification, three goals in the FIFA World Cup finals, 10 goals in friendlies, 10 goals in UEFA European Championship qualifying and an all-time record 14 goals in the UEFA Nations League. The opponent against whom he has scored most often is Luxembourg, with six goals. His most successful goal-scoring year was 2018, when he scored 12 goals in 13 international appearances. The only year in which he has failed to score a goal for Serbia was 2014.

List of international goals
 Scores and results list Serbia's goal tally first. Green indicates a match that Serbia won, red a match that Serbia lost and yellow a match that ended in a draw.

Hat-tricks

Statistics

See also

List of men's footballers with 50 or more international goals
List of top international men's football goal scorers by country

References
Footnotes

Citations

External links
Aleksandar Mitrović Football Association of Serbia

Mitrović
Mitrovic, Aleksandar
Serbia national football team